The economy of Burundi is $3.436 billion by gross domestic product as of 2018, being heavily dependent on agriculture, which accounts for 32.9% of gross domestic product as of 2008. Burundi itself is a landlocked country lacking resources, and with almost nonexistent industrialization. Agriculture supports more than 70% of the labor force, the majority of whom are subsistence farmers. 

Although Burundi is potentially sufficient in food production, civil unrest, overpopulation, and soil erosion have contributed to the contraction of the subsistence economy by 25% in recent years. Large numbers of internally displaced persons have been unable to produce their own food and are largely dependent on international humanitarian assistance. Burundi is a net food importer, with food accounting for 17% of imports in 1997. Burundi is a least developed country according to the United Nations.

Agriculture
Burundi produced in 2018:

 2.3 million tons of cassava;
 1.6 million tons of banana;
 583 thousand tons of sweet potato;
 556 thousand tons of vegetables;
 393 thousand tons of beans;
 302 thousand tons of potato;
 290 thousand tons of maize;
 178 thousand tons of sugar cane;
 85 thousand tons of palm oil;
 56 thousand tons of taro;
 55 thousand tons of rice;
 52 thousand tons of tea;

In addition to smaller productions of other agricultural products, like sorghum (28 thousand tons) and coffee (14 thousand tons).

Industry
Little industry exists except for the processing of agricultural exports. Although potential wealth in petroleum, nickel, copper, and other natural resources is being explored, the uncertain security situation has prevented meaningful investor interest. Industrial development also is hampered by Burundi's distance from the sea and high transport costs. Lake Tanganyika remains an important trading point. The trade embargo, lifted in 1999, negatively impacted trade and industry. Since October 1993 the nation has suffered from massive ethnic-based violence which has resulted in the death of perhaps 250,000 people and the displacement of about 800,000 others. Foods, medicines, and electricity remain in short supply.

Burundi is heavily dependent on bilateral and multilateral aid, with external debt totaling $1.247 billion (1.247 G$) in 1997. A series of largely unsuccessful 5-year plans initiated in July 1986 in partnership with the World Bank and the International Monetary Fund attempted to reform the foreign exchange system, liberalize imports, reduce restrictions on international transactions, diversify exports, and reform the coffee industry.

IMF structural adjustment programs in Burundi were suspended following the outbreak of the crisis in 1993. The World Bank has identified key areas for potential growth, including the productivity of traditional crops and the introduction of new exports, light manufactures, industrial mining, and services. Other serious problems include the state's role in the economy, the question of governmental transparency, and debt reduction.

To protest the 1996 coup by President Pierre Buyoya, neighboring countries imposed an economic embargo on Burundi. Although the embargo was never officially ratified by the United Nations Security Council, most countries refrained from official trade with Burundi. Following the coup, the United States also suspended all but humanitarian aid to Burundi. The regional embargo was lifted on January 23, 1999, based on progress by the government in advancing national reconciliation through the Burundi peace process.

In an article titled "The Blood Cries Out," Foreign Policy (FP) reported that the Burundian population growth rate is 2.5 percent per year, more than double the average global pace, and that a Burundian woman has on average 6.3 children, nearly triple the international fertility rate.  FP further reported that "The vast majority of Burundians rely on subsistence farming, but under the weight of a booming population and in the long-standing absence of coherent policies governing land ownership, many people barely have enough earth to sustain themselves." In 2014, the average size for a farm was about one acre. FP added that "The consequence is remarkable scarcity: In the 2013 Global Hunger Index, Burundi had the severest hunger and malnourishment rates of all 120 countries ranked."

Macro-economic trend 
The following table shows the main economic indicators in 1980–2017.

See also
 United Nations Economic Commission for Africa
 List of companies based in Burundi

References

External links

Burundi latest trade data on ITC Trade Map

 
Burundi